Tell Jabin is a Kurdish town in northern Syria, administratively part of the A'zaz District of Aleppo Governorate, located north of Aleppo. Nearby localities include Tell Rifaat and Kafr Naya to the north, Mare' to the northeast, Bayanoun, Mayer and al-Zahraa to the west. According to the Syria Central Bureau of Statistics, Tell Jabin had a population of 2,579 in the 2004 census.

References

Populated places in Aleppo Governorate